"Si no te hubieras ido" ("If You Hadn't Left") is a song written by Mexican singer-songwriter Marco Antonio Solís, which has been recorded by a number of performers.

Song history
The song was written in 1983 and was first included in the album Sin El by singer Marisela. The album was written and produced by Solís in 1984. The song was released as a single and became very successful in Mexico. The singer later included it on her live album Tu Dama de Hierro released on 27 April 1999 as a part of a medley with two other songs written by Solís: "Vete con Ella" and "No Puedo Olvidarlo". "No Puedo Olvidarlo" was re-recorded by Marco Antonio Solís as "No Puedo Olvidarla" and became a Top Ten hit in the Billboard Hot Latin Tracks in 2007.

Marco Antonio Solís re-recording

Marco Antonio Solís re-recorded the track to include it on his album Trozos de Mi Alma, a collection of songs written by him previously recorded by several performers. This version was featured in the movie Y Tu Mamá También and in the movie soundtrack, and became another top-ten smash for Solís, peaking at number four in the Billboard Hot Latin Tracks chart. It is also recognized as one of Solís's signature songs.

Charlie Cruz version

In 2000, Puerto Rican salsa musician Charlie Cruz covered Si no te hubieras ido on his album, Asi Soy. The song was the second single released from the album and did not fare on the charts, only peaking #40 on the Hot Latin Tracks.

Maná version

Mexican rock band Maná recorded the track for their new live album titled Arde El Cielo, due 29 April 2008. The single was released to radio on 3 March 2008, and debuted at number 7 in the Billboard Hot Latin Tracks chart in the week of 12 April 2008, climbing to number 1, 2 weeks later.

Certifications and sales

Music video
The music video for the song was directed by Pablo Croce.

See also
List of number-one Billboard Hot Latin Songs of 2008

References

Marco Antonio Solís songs
Songs written by Marco Antonio Solís
1985 songs
1999 singles
2000 singles
2008 singles
Charlie Cruz songs
Maná songs
Marisela songs
Fonovisa Records singles
Warner Music Latina singles
Spanish-language songs